The Fulton Street station was a station on the demolished section of the BMT Fifth Avenue Line in Brooklyn, New York City. Served by trains of the BMT Culver Line and BMT Fifth Avenue Line, it had two tracks and one island platform. The station was opened on July 27, 1889 at Hudson Avenue and Fulton Street, and was the northernmost Fifth Avenue Line station before the line merged with the BMT Myrtle Avenue Line. It also had connections to the Fulton Street, DeKalb Avenue, and Flatbush Avenue Line streetcars. The next stop to the north was Bridge–Jay Streets. The next stop to the south was Atlantic Avenue, which still exists today as the Atlantic Avenue–Barclays Center subway station complex. It closed on May 31, 1940.

References

External links

BMT Fifth Avenue Line stations
Railway stations in the United States opened in 1889
Railway stations closed in 1940
Former elevated and subway stations in Brooklyn